The Glass Virgin is a British three-part television serial, or long TV movie, first broadcast in 1995, starring Emily Mortimer and Brendan Coyle, directed by Sarah Hellings, based on a novel by Catherine Cookson.

Production
Producer Ray Marshall bought the film rights to several of the period works of Catherine Cookson, beginning in 1989 with The Fifteen Streets, which had been turned into a successful stage play. These productions, sponsored by Tyne Tees Television, were very popular and drew between ten and fourteen million viewers each.

Reviewing The Glass Virgin for The Independent, Jasper Rees commented that it "might have been sponsored by the Northumbrian tourist board, as it gives the impression that the region endlessly basks in sunshine."

Outline
The action takes place in the north of England in the 1870s. Annabella Lagrange (Emily Mortimer), the daughter of upper class parents, finds her life crumbling when she discovers a terrible secret. She runs away from home, then meets Manuel Mendoza (Brendan Coyle), a young Irishman she remembers as her father’s departed groom. He is now a traveller, roaming Northumberland in a horse-drawn caravan looking for work, and Annabella soon finds herself traveling with him, but in a separate bed. 

Many of the people she meets treat her with suspicion, and she feels she belongs nowhere, so is glad of the understanding of Manuel. Meanwhile, her family, and especially her father Edmund Lagrange (Nigel Havers) are looking for her.

Cast
Emily Mortimer as Annabella Lagrange
Brendan Coyle as Manuel Mendoza 
Nigel Havers as Edmund Lagrange 
Sylvia Syms as Lady Constance
Christine Kavanagh as Rosina Lagrange 
Jean Heywood as Amy 
Jan Graveson as Betty Watford
Frederick Treves as Great Uncle James 
Samantha Glenn as Young Annabella 
Venetia Barrett as Great Aunt Emma
Ford Prefect as Michael Fairbairn
Hywel Berry as Danny Dinning
Catherine Terris as Mrs Fairbairn

Notes

External links

1995 British television series debuts
1995 British television series endings
1990s British drama television series
ITV television dramas
1990s British television miniseries
Period television series
Television shows based on British novels
Television shows set in Tyne and Wear
Television shows set in Northumberland
Television series by ITV Studios
Television shows produced by Tyne Tees Television
English-language television shows
Television series set in the 1870s
British television films